Manzil is a 1979 Indian Bollywood romantic drama film directed by Basu Chatterjee. The film was loosely inspired by the Bengali film Akash Kusum (1965). Manzil stars Amitabh Bachchan and Moushumi Chatterjee in pivotal roles. The film won critical acclaim for its story, while Bachchan was praised for his performance, although, the film did only average business at the box office. The song Rimjhim Gire Saawan is a chartbuster. The movie was reported to be the only Hindi movie to have galvanometer in its core plot.

Plot
The story of the movie starts with Ajay Chandra, a young man (Amitabh Bachchan) having big dreams. He falls for Aruna Khosla, a rich girl (Moushumi Chaterjee). She falls for him as well. He pretends to be rich not to disappoint her and takes help from his friend Prakash Mariwalla who was a 
Chartered Accountant, for suit, car and flat, claiming all as his own. He wants to start a galvanometer business by buying old ones and refurbishing them to workable ones with the help of Anokhelal. Unfortunately, the big cats try to buy him out, but Ajay doesn't budge. So, they buy Anokhelal by bribing him with money for his daughters wedding. This leads to a big failure for Ajay, whose mother Mrs. Chandra (Lalita Pawar) has to give the insurance money to her son to bail him out. It still doesn't work and Ajay is taken to court by Mr. Khosla, a lawyer. Mrs. Chandra encourages her son to repair the galvanometers himself and when he falls short of money, sells her gold jewellery. The prosecutor withdraws the case as the galvanometers are now repaired. His friend C.A Prakash Mariwalla also helps him with ten thousand rupees in disguise of an order.

Cast
 Amitabh Bachchan as Ajay Chandra
 Moushumi Chatterjee as Aruna Khosla
 Rakesh Pandey as Prakash Mariwala
 Satyen Kappu as Advocate Khosla
 Urmila Bhatt as Mrs. Khosla
 Lalita Pawar as Mrs. Chandra 
 Shreeram Lagoo as Mr. Kapoor
 A. K. Hangal as Anokhelal
 C. S. Dubey as Tolaram Chhaganmal

Soundtrack
The Music of the movie was given by R. D. Burman and the lyrics are written by the legendary lyricist Yogesh.

References

External links

1970s Hindi-language films
1979 films
Indian romantic drama films
Films directed by Basu Chatterjee
Films scored by R. D. Burman
1979 romantic drama films